Josh Ford (born 1987) is an American soccer player.

Josh Ford or Joshua Ford may also refer to:

 Josh Ford, a fictional character in the TV series Popular
 Joshua Ford, murder victim of Erika and Benjamin Sifrit